In mathematics, specifically abstract algebra, a square class of a field  is an element of the square class group, the quotient group  of the multiplicative group of nonzero elements in the field modulo the square elements of the field. Each square class is a subset of the nonzero elements (a coset of the multiplicative group) consisting of the elements of the form xy2 where x is some particular fixed element and y ranges over all nonzero field elements.

The quotient of these two groups is a group with two elements, corresponding to two cosets: the set of positive numbers and the set of negative numbers. Thus, the real numbers have two square classes, the positive numbers  and the negative numbers.

Square classes are frequently studied in relation to the theory of quadratic forms.

Every element of the square class group is an involution. It follows that, if the number of square classes of a field is finite, it must be a power of two.

References

Field (mathematics)